Michael Talbott (born February 2, 1955) is an American actor. He portrayed Detective Stanley Switek in the crime drama television series Miami Vice (1984–1989).

Early life
Michael was born on February 2, 1955, in Waverly, Iowa, to parents Kay and John Talbott.

Career
Talbott is best known for his co-starring role as Detective Stanley Switek in the 1980s television series Miami Vice. His other television credits include M*A*S*H, Sanford and Son, The Jeffersons, Eight is Enough and other series.

He appeared in a number of films, playing a bully in Carrie, a party-crasher in Big Wednesday, a highway patrolman in Any Which Way You Can, a reckless stunt driver in Used Cars, a real estate agent in Manhunter, and a reluctant deputy in First Blood. Talbott had a small part in National Lampoon's Vacation but his scene was edited out of the final cut, although his character "Cowboy" is shown in a photograph during the end credits, and his name appears in the credits as well.

Personal life
Talbott is outspoken supporter and member of National Rifle Association. He currently lives in his hometown of Waverly, Iowa.

As of 2011 he is also a spokesperson/presenter for Panteao Productions, a production company and distributor of firearms and tactical videos.

Filmography

Film

Television

Video games

References

External links
 

1955 births
Living people
20th-century American male actors
21st-century American male actors
Male actors from Iowa
American male film actors
American male television actors
People from Waverly, Iowa